Sir Richard Budden Crowder, QC (17 May 1796 – 5 December 1859) was a British Liberal Party politician and judge.

He was elected at a by-election in 1849 as Member of Parliament (MP) for Liskeard in Cornwall, and held the seat until he resigned from the House of Commons in March 1854 to take an appointment as a judge in the Court of Common Pleas. Whilst in Parliament, he was simultaneously Judge Advocate of the Fleet from 1849 to 1854.

References

External links 
 

1859 deaths
Justices of the Common Pleas
Liberal Party (UK) MPs for English constituencies
Members of the Parliament of the United Kingdom for Liskeard
UK MPs 1847–1852
UK MPs 1852–1857

Year of birth missing
English King's Counsel
Knights Bachelor